Alter is a lunar impact crater that is located in the northern hemisphere on the far side of the Moon. It lies to the southwest of the larger crater Robertson, and to the east of Ohm.

The outer rim of Alter has been degraded by subsequent erosion, most notably at the northern and southern extremes. There is a small crater lying across the south-southeast rim. A cleft runs across the floor from the southern rim toward the north-northeast. Ray material cross the crater floor from the east, forming a pair of faint bands.

Satellite craters
By convention these features are identified on lunar maps by placing the letter on the side of the crater midpoint that is closest to Alter.

References

External links
 

Impact craters on the Moon